Wollert Konow may refer to:
Wollert Konow (merchant) (1779–1839), Norwegian merchant, also a politician
Wollert Konow (Prime Minister of Norway) (1845–1924), Norwegian politician, often referred to as "Wollert Konow (SB)"
Wollert Konow (Hedemarken politician) (1847–1932), Norwegian politician, represented the district of Hedemarken, cousin of the above, often referred to as "Wollert Konow (H)"